Ivanildo Jorge Mendes Fernandes (born 26 March 1996) is a Portuguese professional footballer who plays as a central defender for F.C. Vizela.

Club career
Born in Amadora, Lisbon metropolitan area of Cape Verdean descent, Fernandes joined Sporting CP's academy at the age of 18. He spent his first three seasons as senior with the reserves in the Segunda Liga, his maiden appearance in the competition taking place on 20 September 2015 in a 2–1 away win against S.C. Freamunde where he played the 90 minutes.

Fernandes scored his first league goal on 24 August 2016, in a 1–1 away draw with F.C. Famalicão. He finished the campaign with a further goal from 35 appearances, helping to a 14th-place finish. In November 2017, due to injuries to the defensive sector of the first team, he was called for a Taça de Portugal match against Famalicão, but remained unused in the 2–0 victory.

On 27 July 2018, Fernandes was loaned to Moreirense FC. He made his debut in the Primeira Liga on 19 August, playing the entire 2–1 win at C.D. Nacional.

On 31 December 2020, after serving subsequent loans at Turkish clubs Trabzonspor and Çaykur Rizespor, Fernandes joined Spanish Segunda División side UD Almería on loan for the remainder of the season. In the ensuing summer, he signed a permanent three-year contract with F.C. Vizela who had just been promoted to the Portuguese top division.

International career
Fernandes won his only cap for the Portugal under-21 side on 11 October 2018, in a 9–0 demolition of Liechtenstein for the 2019 UEFA European Championship qualifiers at the Rheinpark Stadion.

Career statistics

Honours
Trabzonspor
Turkish Cup: 2019–20

References

External links

Portuguese League profile 

1996 births
Living people
People from Amadora
Portuguese sportspeople of Cape Verdean descent
Sportspeople from Lisbon District
Black Portuguese sportspeople
Portuguese footballers
Association football defenders
Primeira Liga players
Liga Portugal 2 players
Sporting CP B players
Moreirense F.C. players
F.C. Vizela players
Süper Lig players
Trabzonspor footballers
Çaykur Rizespor footballers
Segunda División players
UD Almería players
Portugal youth international footballers
Portugal under-21 international footballers
Portuguese expatriate footballers
Expatriate footballers in Turkey
Expatriate footballers in Spain
Portuguese expatriate sportspeople in Turkey
Portuguese expatriate sportspeople in Spain